South Korea competed at the 2009 World Championships in Athletics from 15 to 23 August. A team of 18 athletes was announced in preparation for the competition.

Team selection

Results

Men

Women

References
Entry list. European Athletic Association (2009-07-30).

External links
Official competition website

Nations at the 2009 World Championships in Athletics
World Championships in Athletics
2009